The 2023 Players Championship was the 50th playing of the Players Championship, having been played at TPC Sawgrass in Ponte Vedra Beach, Florida from March 9–12. 

The winner was Scottie Scheffler, who shot a 69 in the final round to finish at 271 (−17) to win his first Players Championship, five strokes ahead of runner-up Tyrrell Hatton. 

Defending champion Cameron Smith became the first player since 2014 not to defend the title, being one of many players ineligible to compete having been suspended by the PGA Tour after joining LIV Golf. Other ineligible players included both the runner-up and third place finishers from 2022, Anirban Lahiri and Paul Casey.

Venue

Field
The field consists of 144 players meeting various criteria; they include tournament winners on the PGA Tour since the previous Players Championship, recent winners of major championships, The Players and World Golf Championships, and leading players in the FedEx Cup standings from the current and preceding seasons.

Eligibility criteria
This list details the eligibility criteria for the 2023 Players Championship and the players who qualified under them; any additional criteria under which players were eligible is indicated in parentheses.

1. Winners of PGA Tour events since the 2022 Players Championship

Keegan Bradley (2,16,17)
Sam Burns (2,16)
Patrick Cantlay (2,8,14,16)
Nico Echavarría
Tony Finau (2,16,17)
Matt Fitzpatrick (2,5,16)
Russell Henley (2,16)
Max Homa (2,15,16,17)
Billy Horschel (2,10,14,16)
Mackenzie Hughes (2)
Kim Si-woo (2,4,16,17)
Tom Kim (2,16,17)
Chris Kirk (2,16,17)
Kurt Kitayama (2,13,16)
Lee Kyoung-hoon (2,16)
Rory McIlroy (2,4,8,12,16)
Trey Mullinax (2)
J. T. Poston (2)
Séamus Power (2,16,17)
Jon Rahm (2,5,14,15,16,17)
Chad Ramey (2)
Chez Reavie (2)
Justin Rose (2,16)
Xander Schauffele (2,16)
Scottie Scheffler (2,3,10,13,16,17)
J. J. Spaun (2)
Jordan Spieth (2,7,16)
Adam Svensson (2)
Justin Thomas (2,4,6,11,16)
Will Zalatoris (2,16)

2. Top 125 from the previous season's FedEx Cup Playoffs and Eligibility Points List

Christiaan Bezuidenhout
Ryan Brehm
Hayden Buckley
Stewart Cink
Wyndham Clark
Corey Conners (16)
Joel Dahmen
Cameron Davis
Jason Day (16)
Tyler Duncan
Tommy Fleetwood (16)
Rickie Fowler
Dylan Frittelli
Doug Ghim
Lucas Glover
Emiliano Grillo
Chesson Hadley
Adam Hadwin
James Hahn
Brian Harman (16)
Tyrrell Hatton (13,16)
Lucas Herbert
Kramer Hickok
Lee Hodges
Tom Hoge (16)
Beau Hossler
Viktor Hovland (16)
Mark Hubbard
Im Sung-jae (16)
Stephan Jäger
Kevin Kisner (10,16)
Patton Kizzire
Russell Knox
Kelly Kraft
Matt Kuchar
Martin Laird
Nate Lashley
David Lipsky
Luke List
Adam Long
Justin Lower
Shane Lowry (7,16)
Peter Malnati
Hideki Matsuyama (3)
Denny McCarthy
Max McGreevy
Maverick McNealy
Troy Merritt
Keith Mitchell (16)
Taylor Moore
Collin Morikawa (6,7,9,16)
Matthew NeSmith
Alex Norén (16)
Ryan Palmer
Taylor Pendrith
Scott Piercy
Andrew Putnam
Aaron Rai
Doc Redman
Davis Riley
Patrick Rodgers
Sam Ryder
Adam Schenk
Matthias Schwab
Adam Scott (15,16)
Greyson Sigg
Webb Simpson (4)
Alex Smalley
Austin Smotherman
Scott Stallings
Sepp Straka (16)
Robert Streb
Kevin Streelman
Callum Tarren
Nick Taylor
Sahith Theegala (16,17)
Michael Thompson
Brendon Todd
Kevin Tway
Jhonattan Vegas
Matt Wallace
Nick Watney
Danny Willett
Aaron Wise (16)
Gary Woodland (5)
Brandon Wu
Cameron Young (16)

Daniel Berger, Lanto Griffin, John Huh, Pan Cheng-tsung and Vince Whaley did not play.

3. Recent winners of the Masters Tournament (2018–2022)
Tiger Woods did not play.

4. Recent winners of The Players Championship (2017–2022)

5. Recent winners of the U.S. Open (2017–2022)

6. Recent winners of the PGA Championship (2017–2022)

7. Recent winners of The Open Championship (2017–2022)
Francesco Molinari

8. Recent winners of the FedEx Cup (2019/20–2021/22)

9. Recent winners of the WGC Championship (2020–2021)

10. Recent winners of the WGC Match Play (2019–2022)

11. Recent winners of the WGC Invitational (2019–2021)

12. Recent winners of the WGC-HSBC Champions (2019)

13. Recent winners of the Arnold Palmer Invitational (2020–2023)

14. Recent winners of the Memorial Tournament (2019–2022)

15. Recent winners of the Genesis Invitational (2020–2023)

16. Top 50 from the Official World Golf Ranking following The Honda Classic

Ryan Fox
Min Woo Lee

17. Top 10 in the current season's FedEx Cup points standings after The Honda Classic

18. Senior Players champion from previous year
Jerry Kelly

19. Leading points winners from the Korn Ferry Tour and Korn Ferry Tour Finals during the previous year
Justin Suh (led both categories)

20. Top 125 (medical extension)
Nick Hardy

21. Remaining positions and alternates filled through current year FedEx Cup standings following The Honda Classic

Taylor Montgomery (14)
Thomas Detry (17)
Davis Thompson (31)
Eric Cole (33)
Ben Griffin (37)
Robby Shelton (47)
Tyson Alexander (48)
Garrick Higgo (50)
Kim Seong-hyeon (53)
An Byeong-hun (57)
Will Gordon (61)
Joseph Bramlett (62)
David Lingmerth (63)
Harris English (73)
Aaron Baddeley (75)
Ben Martin (79)
Harrison Endycott (87)
Andrew Novak (102)
Erik Barnes (110)
Dylan Wu (111)
Ryan Armour (112)

Ben Taylor (27) and Yu Chun-an (51) did not play.

Ineligible players
The following players met criteria but, having joined LIV Golf, were suspended by the PGA Tour and ineligible to compete:

Abraham Ancer (11,16)
Bryson DeChambeau (5,13)
Talor Gooch (16)
Dustin Johnson (3,8)
Brooks Koepka (5,6,11)
Anirban Lahiri (2)
Danny Lee (2)
Marc Leishman (2)
Phil Mickelson (6)
Sebastián Muñoz (2)
Joaquín Niemann (2,15,16)
Mito Pereira (2,16)
Thomas Pieters (16)
Patrick Reed (9)
Cameron Smith (1,2,4,7,16)
Brendan Steele (2)
Cameron Tringale (2)
Harold Varner III (2,16)

Round summaries

First round
Thursday, March 9, 2023
Friday, March 10, 2023

Due to lack of daylight, play was suspended at 6:30 pm EST Thursday with 21 players yet to complete their opening rounds.

Chad Ramey, ranked 225 in the Official World Golf Ranking and making his Players Championship debut, recorded a bogey-free round of 64 (8 under par) to take the first-round lead. He birdied the par-5 16th hole to tie for the lead, before hitting his tee shot on the 17th hole to within two feet, setting up another birdie and moving him atop the leaderboard.

Collin Morikawa also did not make a bogey in a seven-under par round of 65, that included an eagle on the par-5 second hole. He finished alone in second place, one stroke behind Ramey.

The top-three players in the world rankings: Jon Rahm, Scottie Scheffler, and Rory McIlroy; were drawn together, but only Scheffler made his way into the top-10 at the end of the round. After beginning his round with nine straight pars, Scheffler birdied three of his final four holes to finish at four-under par (68). Rahm did not make a birdie on his back-nine that included a bogey on the par-3 eighth hole, his 17th, finishing at one-under par (71). McIlroy, the 2019 champion, double-bogeyed his opening hole in a round of 76 (4 over par).

Hayden Buckley made a hole-in-one on the 17th during his round of 73 (1 over par).

Second round
Friday, March 10, 2023
Saturday, March 11, 2023

Adam Svensson birdied the par-5 ninth hole, the last of his round, after getting a free drop from the hospitality tent on his second shot to finish off a five-under round of 67 and take a two-shot lead through 36 holes at nine-under.

Scottie Scheffler made three birdies on his back-nine and shot 69 (−3) to move into second place at seven-under. Christiaan Bezuidenhout shared the lead with Svensson when play was suspended but bogeyed two of his final three holes on Saturday morning to fall back to a share of third place at six-under, three behind.

Overnight leader Chad Ramey birdied two of his first three holes and led by as many as three shots early in his round before putting two balls in the water on the par-3 17th, leading to a quadruple-bogey. He ended up at five-under, four back, after a round of 75 (+3).

Jerry Kelly became the oldest player to make the cut in Players Championship history, surpassing Arnold Palmer, who had held the record for making the cut in the 1985 Tournament Players Championship at 55 years, 6 months and 19 days. Kelly was 56 years, 3 months and 16 days old.

The cut came in at 146 (+2), with 75 players making it to the weekend. Notables to miss the cut included 2019 champion Rory McIlroy, 2018 champion Webb Simpson, and 2022 U.S. Open champion Matt Fitzpatrick. World No. 1 Jon Rahm withdrew before the start of his second round due to illness.

Due to heavy rain and thunderstorms, play was suspended at 4:27 pm EST Friday. It was the second year in a row that the second round play was not be completed on the Friday due to severe weather. The PGA Tour announced that play would resume on Saturday at 7:00 am, with the third round starting around 10:45, with players in groups of three, instead of the usual two, and commencing from both the first and tenth tees.

Third round
Saturday, March 11, 2023

Scottie Scheffler moved into the lead with a birdie on his first hole followed by chipping in for eagle on the second. He made five more birdies during the rest of his round for a round of 65 (7 under par) which gave him a two-shot lead through 54 holes at 14 under par.

Min Woo Lee began his round by holing out from 112 yards on the first hole for an eagle. He joined Scheffler in the lead with a birdie on the 11th hole, then moved one ahead with another birdie on the 12th, before falling behind again over the final six holes. His round of 66 (6 under par) put him at 12 under par, two strokes behind Scheffler.

Aaron Rai made a hole-in-one on the 17th hole in a seven-under round of 65, moving him into a tie for fourth place. With Hayden Buckley in the first round, it marked the first time in Players Championship history two players had made a hole-in-one on the 17th hole in the same tournament.

Tom Hoge, who had made the cut on the number, set a tournament record with a round of 62; he made ten birdies during his round, ending with a 10-foot putt on the ninth hole, his last. He moved from a tie for 65th place at the start of the round up to a tie for eighth.

Second-round leader Adam Svensson was even-par on his round before a triple-bogey on the par-4 14th hole dropped him back to six-under and 14th place.

The scoring average for the round was 69.57, the lowest in Players Championship history.

Scorecard of Tom Hoge

Final round
Sunday, March 12, 2023

On the fourth hole, Lee made a triple-bogey having hit his third shot into the water; he dropped further behind as the round went on and finished in a tie for sixth at eight under par. Starting the day at five under par, Hideki Matsuyama was seven under par for his round through 13 holes, and one stroke behind at 12 under par, before he made a double bogey on the 14th hole; a further dropped shot on the final hole meant he finished at 9 under par, good enough for fifth place on his own.

Through the middle of the round, Scheffler made five consecutive birdies to reach 18 under par and open a six stroke lead over the rest of the field. He made one bogey and five pars over the closing six holes to finish with a round of 69 (3 under par), and at 17 under par, win his first Players Championship title by five strokes.

Tyrrell Hatton began the round nine shots off the lead, in a tie for 26th place; he was even-par on the front-nine before making seven birdies in taking 29 strokes to play the back-nine, tying the tournament record, for a round of 65 (7 under par) to finish alone in second place at 12 under par. Tom Hoge and Viktor Hovland finished with rounds of 70 and 68 respectively to finish tied for third place. Max Homa went birdie-eagle-birdie on the 10th, 11th and 12th holes to reach 10-under and move into a tie for second; after a run of pars, he made a double-bogey on the 17th hole after his tee shot found the water to fall back to eight under par. Finishing alongside Homa and Lee in a tie for sixth place were Cameron Davis, Im Sung-jae, David Lingmerth, Justin Rose and Justin Suh.

Alex Smalley made a hole-in-one on the 17th hole; the first time there had been three holes-in-one recorded at the same hole during a tournament in Players Championship history.

Scorecard
Final round

Cumulative tournament scores, relative to par
{|class="wikitable" span = 50 style="font-size:85%;
|-
|  style="background:Red;  width:10px;"|
|Eagle
|  style="background:Pink; width:10px;"|
|Birdie
|  style="background:PaleGreen; width:10px;"|
|Bogey
|    style="background:Green; width:10px;"|
|Double bogey
|    style="background:Olive; width:10px;"|
|Triple bogey+
|}

Notes

References

External links

2022 Official Media Guide

2023
2023 in golf
2023 in American sports
2023 in sports in Florida
March 2023 sports events in the United States